Pierre Rabon (18 October 1619 – 18 January 1684) was a French portrait painter, who was active during the reign of Louis XIV.

Early life
Rabon was born in Le Havre.

Career
Rabon became a member of the Académie Royale de Peinture et de Sculpture on 3 July 1660. His reception piece was a portrait of Antoine de Ratabon, who at the time was both Superintendent of Buildings (Surintendant des Bâtiments) and the director of the Académie. His portrait of Ratabon was for a long time believed to have been lost, but in 1994, a painting in the collection of the Château de Versailles, which had previously been identified by Albert Laprade as a portrait of the architect Louis Le Vau, was proposed as more likely to be Rabon's portrait of Ratabon.

Rabon exhibited a portrait of a Monsieur Perier at the Paris Salon of 1673. There are also records of copies commissioned by the Bâtiments du Roi: Christ on the Cross after Charles Le Brun in 1667 for the Menagerie at Versailles and Equestrian portrait of Louis XIV after Mignard in 1671.

In 2000, the painting Saint John Preaching in the Desert (Musée des Beaux-Arts, Carcassonne), previously believed to be a work by Sébastien Bourdon, was reattributed to Pierre Rabon.

Personal life
Pierre Rabon married Louise Gomboust on 29 October 1643. Their son, Nicolas Rabon (1644–1686), became a history painter. Pierre Rabon died in Paris.

Gallery

Notes

Bibliography
 Bajou, Thierry (1998). La peinture à Versailles : XVIIe siècle. [English edition: Paintings at Versailles: XVIIth Century, translated by Elizabeth Wiles-Portier, p. 76.] Paris: Réunion des musées nationaux.  .  (English edition).
 Ballon, Hilary (1999). Louis Le Vau: Mazarin's Collège, Colbert's Revenge. Princeton University Press. .
Benezit Dictionary of Artists (2006), vol. 11, p. 575 ("Rabon, Pierre" and "Rabon, Nicolas"). Paris: Gründ. .
 Fontaine, André (1914). Académiciens d'autrefois. Paris: H. Laurens. Copy at Internet Archive.
 Hardouin, Christophe (1994). "La Collection de portraits de l'Académie royale de Peinture et de Sculpture: Peintures entrées sous le règne de Louis XIV (1648–1715", Mémoire de D.E.A., Université de Paris IV, 1994, pp. 164–166.
 Jal, Auguste (1872). "Rabon (Pierre), — (Nicolas)", pp. 1030–1031, in Dictionnaire critique de biographie et d'histoire, 2nd edition. Paris: Henri Plon. Title page at Gallica.
 Laprade, Albert (1955). "Portraits des premiers architectes de Versailles", Revue des Arts, March 1955, pp. 21–24. 
 Laprade, Albert (1960). François d'Orbay: Architecte de Louis XIV. Paris: Éditions Vincent, Fréal. .
 Montaiglon, Anatole de (1875). Procès-verbaux de l'Académie royale de peinture et de sculpture, 1648-1793, Volume 1 (1648–1672). Paris: Charavay frères. Copy at Internet Archive.
 Montaiglon, Anatole de (1893). Descriptions de l'Académie royale de peinture et de sculpture par son secrétaire Nicolas Guérin et par Antoine-Nicolas Dézallier d'Argenville le fils (1715–1781). Paris: La Société de propagation des livres d'art. Copy at Gallica.
 Williams, Hannah (2015). Académie Royale: A History in Portraits. Farnham, Surrey: Ashgate. .

1619 births
1684 deaths
Artists from Le Havre
17th-century French painters
French male painters
French Baroque painters
Members of the Académie royale de peinture et de sculpture